The Declaration of Neutrality was a declaration by the Austrian Parliament declaring the country permanently neutral. It was enacted on 26 October 1955 as a constitutional act of parliament, i.e., as part of the Constitution of Austria.

Pursuant to resolution of the Federal Assembly of Parliament following the Austrian State Treaty, Austria declared "its permanent neutrality of its own accord". The second section of this law stated: "In all future times Austria will not join any military alliances and will not permit the establishment of any foreign military bases on her territory."

History
Formally, the declaration was promulgated voluntarily by the Republic of Austria. Politically, it was the direct consequence of the allied occupation by the Soviet Union, the United States, the United Kingdom, and France between 1945 and 1955, from which the country was freed by the Austrian State Treaty of 15 May the same year. The Soviet Union would not have agreed to the State Treaty if Austria had not committed to declaring neutrality after the allied forces had left the country.

Since 1955, neutrality has become a deeply ingrained element of Austrian identity.  An opinion poll from March 2022 found that 76% favored Austria remaining neutral, versus 18% who supported joining NATO.

Membership of Austria in the European Union (or its predecessor organizations) was controversial due to the Austrian commitment to neutrality.  Austria only joined the bloc in 1995 together with Sweden and Finland which had also declared their neutrality in the Cold War, following a referendum on accession.

In 1995, Austria joined NATO's Partnership for Peace program, but only after Russia had done so.

International collaborations 
Austria engages in UN-led peacekeeping and other humanitarian missions. It participates in:
 KFOR, with up to 561 soldiers. This mission is alongside NATO forces. Other countries in this mission include Switzerland, even more well-known for its neutrality.
 EUFOR (former SFOR) in Bosnia and Herzegovina, since 2 December 2004 under European Union Command
 United Nations Interim Force in Lebanon (UNIFIL) in Lebanon.

See also
 Neutral and Non-Aligned European States

References

Bibliography
 Rolf Steininger: Der Staatsvertrag. Österreich im Schatten von deutscher Frage und Kaltem Krieg 1938-1955, 2005, 198 p., (Publisher: StudienVerlag, Innsbruck-Wien-Bozen) - Summary in English
 Manfried Rauchensteiner: Stalinplatz 4. Österreich unter alliierter Besatzung, 2005, 336 p., (Publisher: Edition Steinbauer, Wien)
 The Federal Constitutional Law on the Neutrality of Austria in English

 

Law of Austria
International law
Politics of Austria
Foreign relations of Austria
1955 in Austria
Second Austrian Republic
1955 in international relations
Military history of Austria
Austria–Soviet Union relations
Austria–United States relations
1955 documents